Clark Township is an inactive township in Cole County, in the U.S. state of Missouri.

Clark Township has the name of James Clark, a pioneer citizen.

References

Townships in Missouri
Townships in Cole County, Missouri
Jefferson City metropolitan area